Chivu may refer to:

 Chivu Stoica, Romanian Communist politician
 Cristian Chivu, Romanian footballer
 Stadionul Mircea Chivu, a multi-purpose stadium located in Reşiţa, Romania